Rujevac is a village in Serbia. It is situated in the Ljubovija municipality, in the Mačva District of Central Serbia. The village had a Serb ethnic majority and a population of 522 in 2002.

Historical population

1948: 971
1953: 1,045
1961: 1,001
1971: 896
1981: 767
1991: 643
2002: 522

References

See also
List of places in Serbia

Populated places in Mačva District
Ljubovija